Vicki Lin (born 1984) is a New Zealand television presenter and actor who has appeared on Being Eve and What Now.  She joined What Now alongside Tāmati Coffey. Lin co-hosted Studio 2 between 2007 and 2009. She did not return in 2010, as she got a job opportunity with International Community Radio Taipei in Taiwan.

Lin is of Taiwanese descent and was born and raised in Auckland, New Zealand.

See also
 List of New Zealand television personalities

References

1984 births
Living people
People from Auckland
New Zealand television actresses
New Zealand television presenters
New Zealand women television presenters
New Zealand people of Chinese descent
New Zealand people of Taiwanese descent
People educated at St Cuthbert's College, Auckland